Bird Woman Falls is a  waterfall located immediately west of the continental divide in Glacier National Park, Montana, United States. The falls are readily visible from a distance of two miles (3.2 km) along the Going-to-the-Sun Road, which bisects the park east to west. The falls are fed by snowfields and a remnant glacier located on the north and west flanks of Mount Oberlin. The falls flow is greatest in late spring and early summer and has been known to almost cease flowing in the autumn.

References

External links
 

Going-to-the-Sun Road
Landforms of Flathead County, Montana
Waterfalls of Glacier National Park (U.S.)
Horsetail waterfalls